Goldcliff Priory was a Benedictine monastery in Goldcliff, Newport, South Wales, founded in 1113 by Robert de Chandos and subject to the Abbey of Bec in Normandy. The priory was situated on the site now occupied by Hill Farm, to the south of the current farmhouse, on the prominent knoll of high ground next to the sea. As late as the 1950s Hando remarked that outlines of buildings which were probably part of the priory could still be seen in grass patterns or crop marks at certain times of the year. By the 1970s the only remaining physical remnant of the priory was to be found as part of a cellar in the farm house.

Royal Commission aerial photography on 24 May 2010 recorded parched building foundations of a substantial building on the south side of a larger enclosure.

History
In 1113 the manor of Monksilver, near Williton in Somerset, was given by Robert de Chandos to endow his new priory.  Until the 14th century the manor was called Silver, but thereafter it was called Silver Monachorum or Monksilver because of its ownership by the Priory.

Robert de Chandos was followed by his son Robert, who died in 1120 and was buried on the south side of the choir in Goldcliff parish church. The community was a sizable one at times – there were 25 monks in 1295, and still eight towards its close. It also supported secular chaplains to assist with its work, with four of these in 1297. Unusually, as at the modern communities of Prinknash and Farnborough, the monks at Goldcliff wore white habits. This was in contrast to the black ones typically worn by other Benedictine monks, like those at Ramsgate and elsewhere.

In 1322 the prior at Goldcliff was William de Saint Albin. A series of charters exist for Goldcliff Priory, as do 13th-century accounts of how the drainage system worked. Local farmers widely attribute the reclamation of the surrounding farmland and the construction of the large "Monksditch" to the monks. In 1334 the prior Phillip Gopillarius ("Philip de Gopylers") was charged – along with a monk, some clergy and fifty other persons from Newport, Nash, Goldcliff, Clevedon and Portishead – with stealing wine and other merchandise from a vessel wrecked at Goldcliff.

In 1424 the prior wrote to the king about continuing coastal erosion and flooding. The Priory walls were close to being destroyed, and ".. half the parish church of the priory was destroyed by the sea".

Henry VI granted the patronage of the priory to Henry Earl of Warwick, with licence to appropriate it to Tewkesbury Abbey. In 1442, with the full approval of Pope Eugene IV, the priory was made a cell of Tewkesbury. The revenues of the monastery did not then exceed 2,000 marks, and the priory was worth £200 a year. The abbot and convent were bound to maintain a prior and two monks in priests' orders. In 1445 the three monks of Tewkesbury were expelled from Goldcliff by the Welsh, although in 1447 they again took possession of it. But their enjoyment of its revenues was short, for in 1450 the priory was granted by Henry VI to Eton College.

Thus, at the Dissolution of the Monasteries, ownership of the parish, together with the valuable salmon fishing rights, passed to Eton College. The Provost and Fellows of Eton were still the lords of the manor and the largest landowners in 1901. Many archival records for the priory (and its successors as lords of the manor), such as deeds and charters for the 12th–16th centuries (mainly 16th-century copies of originals) and manorial records for the 15th and early 16th centuries, are held in the College Archives at Eton.

Priors of Goldcliff
 William de Goldcliff, c. 1190–1219 (Bishop of Llandaff 1219–29, his death)
 Henry, 1248–1248
 Maurice, 1263
 Jean de Plessis, 1265 (becomes prior of Bec, dies shortly afterwards)
 Walter, 1295
 Osbert, 1297–1313
 Ralph de Runceville, 1313–1318
 William de St Albino, 1319–1397
 Philip de Gopylers, 1328–1334 (William Martel intrudes in 1332)
 Thomas Leonc, 1334–1336 (relieved in 1336)
 William de St Albino, 1336–1349 (relieved in 1349)
 Bertand Maheil, 1349–1352 (removed by Abbot of Bec)
 William de St. Vedast, 1352–1357 (had keeping of Ogbourne Priory, 1399)
 German de St. Vedast, 1369–1418
 Lawrence de Bonneville, 1418–1441
 John Twining, 1441–1442 (monk of St Peter's, Gloucester)
 Hugh Morainville, 1445–1447 (uncertain)

The changeover of priors generally took place during the summer, when travel was easier and priors visited Bec for general chapter.

References

History of Newport, Wales
Church in Wales
12th-century establishments in Wales
Christian monasteries in Wales
Christian monasteries established in the 12th century
Benedictine monasteries in Wales